Annabel (born March 18, 1984) is an Argentine–Japanese anisong singer signed to Lantis.

Biography
Although most personal information about her is unknown, in 2012, she revealed via letter her real name to a famous radio station in Tokyo, and that her real given name is also Annabel.

She began her musical career in 2005. In 2006, she and singer Nagi Yanagi formed the unit Binaria; to date, they have released 13 albums. In 2007, she formed another unit with singer Bermei.inazawa called anNina. As anNina, the duo performed the ending themes to the second and third seasons of Higurashi When They Cry. In 2009 she started her career as a solo singer.

Her first song that used to anime theme not commonly mentioned, but in 2009 "My Heaven" which used as the ending theme for anime television series CANAAN catch so much attention. Due to her rise in popularity, she started performing theme songs for anime series. Her first solo single was "Anamnesis," which is used as the ending theme to the 2012 anime television series Another; the single for "Anamnesis" was released on February 8, 2012. Annabel released her second single "Above Your Hand" on May 23, 2012, which is used as the ending theme for the anime television series Sankarea. Her third single, "Signal Graph," was released on July 25, 2012, which is used as the opening theme for the anime television series Love, Elections & Chocolate. She released her first solo album Miniascape on November 28, 2012.

Her sixth single "Small Worldrop" was released on April 24, 2013, used as the opening theme for anime Red Data Girl. The seventh single, "Alternative", by Annabel was released on August 7, 2013, was used as the ending theme for the reboot of the anime Rozen Maiden. Her eighth single "Yoru no Kuni" was released on August 26, 2015. The lead track Yoru no Kuni was used as the ending theme for the anime Gangsta. Also in 2015, she sang the vocals for the theme song of the 3DS game, 7th Dragon III Code:VFD of the 7th Dragon series.

In 2016, she formed the band siraph with Masayuki Hasuo and Masaaki Yamasaki (former School Food Punishment) and Yoshimasa Terui (haisuinonasa) who were the member of her backup band.

Discography

Albums

Singles

Other album appearances

Independent releases 
 Autonomia (March 9, 2008)
 Noctiluca (December 31, 2010)
 "Ignis" (May 1, 2011)
 R.m.k (July 29, 2011)
 "Memory Cycle of a Sentimentalist" (October 30, 2011)
 "Debris" (April 30, 2012)
 "syncretism" (2014)
 "Country of the Night" (2015)

References

External links
Official website 

Anime singers
Japanese women pop singers
Living people
Lantis (company) artists
Argentine people of Japanese descent
Argentine emigrants to Japan
Singers from Buenos Aires
21st-century Japanese singers
21st-century Japanese women singers
1984 births
21st-century Argentine singers